Somabrachys federzonii is a moth in the Somabrachyidae family. It was described by Krüger in 1934.

References

Zygaenoidea
Moths described in 1934